The women's discus throw event at the 1977 Summer Universiade was held at the Vasil Levski National Stadium in Sofia on 22 August.

Results

References

Athletics at the 1977 Summer Universiade
1977